Surgeon Simulator (formerly Surgeon Simulator 2013) is a surgical simulation video game by Tom Jackson, Jack Good, Luke Williams and James Broadley of Bossa Studios. The initial version was created in a 48-hour period for the 2013 Global Game Jam; the developers continued and spent 48 days creating a commercial version. The full version was released via Steam in April 2013, and GOG.com on 10 October 2013 followed by an iPad release on 7 March 2014.

A sequel, Surgeon Simulator 2, was released in August 2020.

Gameplay 
Surgeon Simulator is played in first-person perspective. Mouse movement is used  to control the movement of the player's hand. By holding down the right mouse button and moving the mouse, the player can rotate the hand. The left mouse button is used to lower the hand. By default, the A, W, E, R, and spacebar keys are used to control individual corresponding digits for grasping items. Gameplay consists of the player attempting to perform various surgical procedures, for example a heart transplant. Multiple extra modes are available after completion of the early operations, such as performing an operation while inside an ambulance where surgical instruments bounce around at random, and operating in space where the zero-g environment causes all of the instruments to free-float.

Three free downloadable content (DLC) features and one paid DLC were added after release. The first was released on 21 June 2013, and features an operation in which the player performs surgery on Team Fortress 2s character Heavy, based on the "Meet the Medic" Team Fortress 2 promotional video. The second was released on 9 September 2013, named "Code Name Trisha", and features an operation in which surgery is performed on an alien. The third was released on 2 June 2016, named "Inside Donald Trump", in which a heart transplant is performed on then presidential candidate Donald Trump. On 14 August 2014, an Anniversary A&E Edition was released on Steam. It added the eye and teeth transplants from the iOS version along with some other features, such as operating while running through the hospital corridors.

Plot 
The game's protagonist is a surgeon named Nigel Burke, who has a placement at a fictional hospital somewhere in the United Kingdom in 1987. He carries out various operations, at first on a patient affectionately named 'Bob' by the game developers, and later operates on Bob inside a space station orbiting Earth. Afterwards, he is contacted by an alien race by VHS tape, and operates on one of the aliens, gaining the title of 'Best Surgeon in the Universe'.

Development 
An initial version of Surgeon Simulator 2013 was created for the Global Game Jam in which the team had 48 hours to make the game. The team took inspiration from the game Jurassic Park: Trespasser for the control scheme, which also came about because teams in the jam would gain bonus points if a game used ten buttons on the keyboard. The team initially wanted to assign a finger to each button but soon realized this was impractical and instead only limited this style of control to one hand with the other being controlled by the mouse.

The developers were initially unsure of whether or not the game was "genuinely" funny, although they found themselves laughing they were not sure if it was the game or their sleep deprivation causing it. It was only when they finally presented the prototype to the audience that they realized the comic potential.

Release 
In January 2014, Bossa released footage of an iPad release of the game to be released sometime that year. On 7 March, Surgeon Simulator (at the time called Surgeon Simulator 2013) was released and featured the classic heart and kidney transplants and two new transplants: eye and teeth. The app includes the new corridor feature in which the player has to save Bob while carts with at least seven items pass by and have to not kill him.

There is a new feature taking advantage of heart rate, which makes it more challenging for players. When it reaches 0, the player has to charge the defibrillators to save Bob.

A PlayStation 4 version of the game was announced on 10 June 2014 and released on 12 August 2014, featuring all of the games surgeries in every location. The PS4 version was released and named Surgeon Simulator: A&E Anniversary Edition.

A Nintendo Switch version was announced in July 2018 and released on 13 September 2018, with it being branded as Surgeon Simulator CPR standing for "Cooperative Play Ready". The game included a special local cooperative mode, allowing two players using separate Joy-Con to control Nigel's arms.

Reception 

Reception for the game has been mixed, with critics stating that although the game was hard to control, this difficulty was "part of the appeal." Ars Technica commented upon the narrator's voice-over, saying that it "belies the ridiculousness that unfolds as he flops and flails his way through surgery". Rock, Paper, Shotgun praised the game's humour and fun, and said "Surgeon Simulator 2013 is not a brilliant game. But it is a brilliant joke. In the form of a game. It’s an idea that is a clean magnitude of awesome above 90% of what will be released this year because it is so absurd." Eurogamer rated the game 7/10 and also praised its humour.

Surgeon Simulator 2013 has sold 2 million copies as of 4 February 2015.

References

External links 

2013 video games
Android (operating system) games
Bossa Studios games
Game jam video games
IOS games
Indie video games
Linux games
MacOS games
Medical video games
Nintendo Switch games
Parody video games
PlayStation 4 games
PlayStation Network games
Simulation video games
Single-player video games
Steam Greenlight games
Video games developed in the United Kingdom
Windows games
Video games set in the United Kingdom
Video games set in 1987